Abdenego N'Lola Nankishi (born 6 July 2002) is a German professional footballer who plays as a forward for Eerste Divisie club Heracles Almelo, on loan from Werder Bremen. He has represented Germany internationally at youth levels U17, U19 and U20.

Club career
A youth product of TV Loxstedt and LTS Bremerhaven, Nankishi moved to the academy of Werder Bremen in 2014 and worked his way up through all their youth categories. In 2020, he was promoted to their reserves and in 2021 to their senior team. He made his professional debut with Werder Bremen in a 2–0 DFB-Pokal win over VfL Osnabrück on 7 August 2021.

On 17 August 2022, Nankishi joined Heracles Almelo in the Netherlands on a season-long loan.

International career
Born in Germany, Nankishi is of Angolan descent. He is a youth international for Germany, having represented the country at youth levels U17, U19 and U20.

Career statistics

References

External links
 
 

2002 births
Living people
People from Bremerhaven
German footballers
Association football forwards
Germany youth international footballers
German people of Angolan descent
SV Werder Bremen players
SV Werder Bremen II players
Heracles Almelo players
2. Bundesliga players
Regionalliga players
Eerste Divisie players
German expatriate footballers
German expatriate sportspeople in the Netherlands
Expatriate footballers in the Netherlands